Saudi Arabia–Ukraine relations are foreign relations between Saudi Arabia and Ukraine. Saudi Arabia recognized Ukraine’s independence in 1992.  Diplomatic relations between both countries were established in April 1993.  Saudi Arabia has an embassy in Kyiv.  Ukraine has an embassy in Riyadh and an honorary consulate in Jeddah.

In United Nations General Assembly Resolution 68/262 Saudi Arabia voted in favor of "territorial integrity of Ukraine" and strongly supports Ukraine.

High level visits 

The most important visits between the two countries:
In January 2003, Ukrainian President Leonid Kuchma made an official visit to Saudi Arabia. In 2015 President Petro Poroshenko took part in the funeral ceremony of King Abdullah bin Abdulaziz Al Saud.
 Advisor to the Minister of Energy and Coal Ukrainian Oksana Gryshcnko 21-22/2/2011 Riyadh
 Deputy Minister of the Kingdom of Defense Prince Khalid bin Sultan Al Saud, 19-21/4/2011 Kyiv
 Saudi Minister of Agriculture d / Fahad Balghunaim 2-5/6/2011 Kyiv
 Minister of Finance, Kingdom D / Ibrahim Al-Assaf 1-3/9/2011 Kyiv
 The Joint Commission, headed by the Minister of Transport, Kingdom of d / JabaraSuraiseri 18-20/10/2011 Kyiv
 Minister of Agriculture of Ukraine Mykola Brisejnok 21-24/11/2011 Riyadh
 Ukrainian Foreign Minister Konstantin Gryshcnko 26-27/12/2011 Riyadh

 Saudi Minister of Foreign Affairs Prince Faisal bin Farhan Al Saud 26/02/2023 Kyiv

Trade
In 2020, bilateral trade amounted to USD820.9 million.

Tourism
Ukraine is promoting tourism from Arabic speaking countries especially Saudi Arabia. Ukraine abolished visas for citizens of Saudi Arabia and the opening of direct flights between the two countries would facilitate greater tourism.

See also 
 Foreign relations of Saudi Arabia
 Foreign relations of Ukraine
 Russia–Saudi Arabia relations

References

https://english.alarabiya.net/News/saudi-arabia/2023/02/26/Saudi-Arabia-signs-400-mln-agreement-in-Ukraine-aid-as-Kingdom-s-FM-visits-Kyiv-

External links 
  Ukrainian embassy in Riyadh
  Saudi Ambassador to Ukraine
  About Saudi-Ukrainian Relations
  Saudi Embassy to Ukraine Home Page

 

 
Ukraine
Bilateral relations of Ukraine